Geoff Boss is an American racing driver best known for his appearance in the 2003 CART season for Dale Coyne Racing. Boss also competed across 5 years in Indy Lights where he won the Toronto Grand Prix from pole position and had 4 additional podiums in Long Beach and Detroit. He most recently competed in the 2018 Porsche GT3 Challenge for JDX Racing.

Racing history
Boss competed in the Formula Ford Festival at Brands Hatch in 1992 with Team USA Scholarship. He won the Skip Barber Formula Ford Series three times, twice in 1992 (East and Midwest) and again in 1993 (South), becoming the first driver to win three Championships. He also competed in the 12 Hours of Sebring in 1994 in a Nissan for Leitzinger Racing with his brother Andy. He competed in the Barber Dodge Pro Series from 1993 to 1996, winning races at Miami, Sears Point, Phoenix, Watkins Glen, and Reno. He was runner-up in the 1995 Championship to Jaki Scheckter. He ran in the Indy Lights series from 1997 to 2001, winning the 1999 Toronto Grand Prix from the Pole position. He also had podium finishes at Long Beach (twice) and Detroit (twice). Boss joined the Dale Coyne Racing after a third of the season to replace Joel Camathias in the 11 car during the 2003 CART season. In a total of 12 starts he finished in the points three times, with a best of 9th place at the Lexmark Indy 300 in Australia. Boss competed in the 2018 Porsche GT3 Challenge for JDX Racing achieving a best finish of 6th on three occasions, at Sebring, Mid-Ohio and Watkins Glen.

Racing record

Complete American open-wheel racing results
(key)

Indy Lights

CART World Series

External links
Driver Database Profile

1969 births
Champ Car drivers
Indy Lights drivers
Living people
People from Narragansett, Rhode Island
Racing drivers from Rhode Island
Barber Pro Series drivers

Dale Coyne Racing drivers